Mirzayi ( or) is an Armenian and Azerbaijani female dance of Iranian origin.

Traditionally, it is performed in weddings. It can be performed both by women and men. Different Armenian varieties of the dance recorded in Shirak region are also known as Old Mirzayi and Tarakyama-Mirzayi. In Azerbaijan, the dance is called "Vagzaly".

The dance in culture
The dance was performed in the Soviet Armenian drama film Pepo, which was considered the 'most outstanding' film in Soviet cinema before the outbreak of World War II. Uzeyir Hajibeyov used this dance in "If Not That One, Then This One" operetta composed by him. Mashadi Ibad, a main hero of the comedy, performs "Mirzayi"  in his wedding, in the fourth act of the comedy.

References

External links

 Мирзаи // Армянская советская энциклопедия / Под ред. В. Амбарцумяна. — Ер.: Академия наук АрмССР, 1981. — Т. 7. — С. 617.

Азербайджанский танцы в БСЭ Наряду со стремлением сохранить старинные женские танцы («мирзаи», «узундара») создаются новые. 
Armenian dances
Azerbaijani dances